Mylabris is a genus of beetles in the family Meloidae. It is endemic to the Palearctic realm. The species-rich genus Hycleus (c. 430 spp.) was historically confused with Mylabris. It is superficially similar, but is centered on the Afrotropics.

Species
The genus contains the following species:

 Mylabris abdelkaderi (Escalera, 1909)
 Mylabris afghanica Kaszab, 1953
 Mylabris ajantaensis Saha, 1979
 Mylabris alicae Pic, 1909
 Mylabris allousei (Kaszab, 1960)
 Mylabris alpina Ménétriés, 1832
 Mylabris alterna Laporte de Castelnau, 1840
 Mylabris alternata Harold, 1870
 Mylabris amoenula Ménétriés, 1849
 Mylabris amori Graells, 1858
 Mylabris andongoana Harold, 1879
 Mylabris andrei Pic, 1911
 Mylabris andresi (Pic, 1911)
 Mylabris angustissima Pic, 1909
 Mylabris aperta Gerstaecker, 1873
 Mylabris apicefasciata Sumakov, 1929
 Mylabris apicenigra Sumakov, 1915
 Mylabris arctefasciata Pic, 1907
 Mylabris argyrosticta Fairmaire in Révoil, 1882
 Mylabris atricornis Linell, 1896
 Mylabris atrofasciata (Pic, 1921)
 Mylabris audouini Marseul, 1870
 Mylabris aulica Ménétriés, 1832
 Mylabris aurociliata (Escherich, 1899)
 Mylabris axillaris Billberg, 1813
 Mylabris basibicincta Marseul, 1872
 Mylabris batesi Marseul, 1872
 Mylabris batnensis Marseul, 1870
 Mylabris baulnyi Marseul, 1870
 Mylabris beckeri Escherich, 1890
 Mylabris behanzini Pic, 1913
 Mylabris bella Marseul, 1872
 Mylabris bicincta Marseul, 1872
 Mylabris bifasciata (De Geer, 1778)
 Mylabris bifucata Marseul, 1879
 Mylabris bihumerosa Marseul, 1872
 Mylabris bisseptemmaculata Pic, 1909
 Mylabris bissexguttata Marseul, 1879
 Mylabris bistillata Tan, 1981
 Mylabris bivulnera (Pallas, 1781)
 Mylabris boghariensis Raffray, 1873
 Mylabris breveapicalis (Pic, 1919)
 Mylabris brevicornis Motschulsky, 1872
 Mylabris bululuensis Pic, 1914
 Mylabris buqueti Marseul, 1872
 Mylabris burmeisteri Bertoloni, 1850
 Mylabris calida (Pallas, 1782)
 Mylabris carinifrons Marseul, 1879
 Mylabris carneofasciata Pic, 1913
 Mylabris caroli (Pic, 1899)
 Mylabris chariensis Pic, 1913
 Mylabris chisambensis Wellman, 1909
 Mylabris chudeaui (Bedel, 1921)
 Mylabris ciliciensis (Escherich, 1899)
 Mylabris cincta A. G. Olivier, 1811
 Mylabris cinctoides Kaszab, 1957
 Mylabris coecus (Thunberg, 1791)
 Mylabris coeruleomaculata L. Redtenbacher, 1843
 Mylabris coerulescens Gebler, 1841
 Mylabris concolor Marseul, 1870
 Mylabris connata (Rey, 1892)
 Mylabris convexior Pic, 1909
 Mylabris coryniformis Pic, 1913
 Mylabris crocata (Pallas, 1781)
 Mylabris crux (Escherich, 1899)
 Mylabris cyaneovaria (Reitter, 1889)
 Mylabris damascena Reiche, 1866
 Mylabris dashidorzsi Kaszab, 1964
 Mylabris deferreri Ruiz & García-París, 2004
 Mylabris dejeani Gyllenhaal, 1817
 Mylabris delagrangei (Pic, 1899)
 Mylabris delhiensis Anand, 1984
 Mylabris derosa Péringuey, 1909
 Mylabris dilloni Guérin-Méneville, 1849
 Mylabris discorufescens Pic, 1913
 Mylabris discrepens Marseul, 1879
 Mylabris dispar Marseul, 1872
 Mylabris distincta Thomas, 1899
 Mylabris djebelina (Pic, 1902)
 Mylabris dohrni Marseul, 1872
 Mylabris dokhtouroffi (Escherich, 1899)
 Mylabris doriai Marseul, 1870
 Mylabris dumolini Laporte de Castelnau, 1840
 Mylabris duodecimguttata Erichson, 1843
 Mylabris elegans A. G. Olivier, 1811
 Mylabris elegantissima Zoubkoff, 1837
 Mylabris elongata Herbst, 1784
 Mylabris emiliae (Escherich, 1899)
 Mylabris entebbensis Pic, 1914
 Mylabris ertii Voigts, 1903
 Mylabris escherichi Voigts, 1901
 Mylabris excisofasciata (Heyden, 1883)
 Mylabris externepunctata Faldermann, 1832
 Mylabris fabricii Sumakov, 1924
 Mylabris fenestrata (Escherich, 1899)
 Mylabris festiva (Pallas, 1773)
 Mylabris fiesi Voigts, 1901
 Mylabris filicornis Marseul, 1870
 Mylabris flavicornis (Fabricius, 1801)
 Mylabris flavipennis Motschulsky, 1872
 Mylabris flavoguttata Reiche in Ferret & Galin, 1850
 Mylabris flexuosa A. G. Olivier, 1811
 Mylabris florianii Pic, 1909
 Mylabris formosa Wellman, 1910
 Mylabris foveithorax Pic, 1912
 Mylabris frolovi Fischer von Waldheim, 1823
 Mylabris fuliginosa (Olivier, 1811)
 Mylabris funeraria Gestro, 1895
 Mylabris furcimacula Sumakov, 1915
 Mylabris gamicola Marseul, 1872
 Mylabris gebleri Faldermann, 1837
 Mylabris geminata Fabricius, 1798
 Mylabris gemmula Dohrn, 1873
 Mylabris ghazniana Kaszab, 1973
 Mylabris goaensis Saha, 1979
 Mylabris gonoctylus Saha, 1972
 Mylabris groschkei Kaszab, 1957
 Mylabris guerini Chevrolat, 1840
 Mylabris guptai Anand, 1984
 Mylabris hauseri (Escherich, 1899)
 Mylabris hemprichi Klug, 1845
 Mylabris hieracii Graells, 1849
 Mylabris hilaris Péringuey, 1892
 Mylabris himalayaensis Saha, 1979
 Mylabris hirta Tan, 1992
 Mylabris hirtipennis Raffray, 1873
 Mylabris hollebekei Pic, 1909
 Mylabris holosericea Klug, 1835
 Mylabris horai Saha, 1972
 Mylabris humeralis Walker, 1858
 Mylabris hybrida Marseul, 1872
 Mylabris impedita (Heyden, 1883)
 Mylabris impressa Chevrolat, 1840
 Mylabris inculta (Escherich, 1899)
 Mylabris intermedia Fischer von Waldheim, 1844
 Mylabris interrupta A. G. Olivier, 1801
 Mylabris irrorata (Lichtenstenstein, 1795)
 Mylabris isis Marseul, 1876
 Mylabris jacob Marseul, 1879
 Mylabris kambovensis Pic, 1909
 Mylabris kapuri Saha, 1972
 Mylabris karacaevica (Roubal, 1914)
 Mylabris karakalensis Kryzhanovskij, 1956
 Mylabris klapperichi Kaszab, 1958
 Mylabris klugi L. Redtenbacher, 1850
 Mylabris kodymi Maran, 1944
 Mylabris koenigi (Dokhtouroff, 1889)
 Mylabris kraatzi (Heyden, 1881)
 Mylabris kuzini Kryzhanovskij, 1956
 Mylabris lactimala Marseul, 1879
 Mylabris laevicollis Marseul, 1870
 Mylabris lanigera Marseul, 1879
 Mylabris lateplagiata Fairmaire, 1887
 Mylabris laticollis (Escherich, 1899)
 Mylabris lavaterae (Fabricius, 1801)
 Mylabris ledebouri Gebler, 1829
 Mylabris lemoulti Pic, 1913
 Mylabris liliputana (Escherich, 1899)
 Mylabris liquida Erichson, 1843
 Mylabris longipilis (Pic, 1897)
 Mylabris lucens Escherich, 1904
 Mylabris maceki (Dvorák, 1985)
 Mylabris macilenta Marseul, 1873
 Mylabris maculicornis Voigts, 1903
 Mylabris maculosa Klug, 1835
 Mylabris maculosopunctata Graells, 1858
 Mylabris madani (Escalera, 1909)
 Mylabris madoni Marseul, 1883
 Mylabris magnoguttata (Heyden, 1881)
 Mylabris mandibularis Saha, 1979
 Mylabris mannerheimii Gebler, 1844
 Mylabris manophorus (Lichtenstein, 1795)
 Mylabris manorensis Pic, 1909
 Mylabris manowensis Pic, 1910
 Mylabris marakensis Kaszab, 1953
 Mylabris marginata Fischer von Waldheim, 1844
 Mylabris marschalli Borchmann, 1911
 Mylabris matabele Péringuey, 1909
 Mylabris mateui Pardo Alcaide, 1954
 Mylabris matoppoena Péringuey, 1909
 Mylabris mimosae A. G. Olivier, 1811
 Mylabris mirzayani (Kaszab, 1968)
 Mylabris mocquerysi Pic, 1911
 Mylabris modesta (Escherich, 1899)
 Mylabris mongolica (Dokhtouroff, 1887)
 Mylabris monozona Wellman, 1910
 Mylabris muata Harold, 1878
 Mylabris munda (Escherich, 1897)
 Mylabris myrmidon Marseul, 1870
 Mylabris nathi Saha, 1979
 Mylabris neavei Pic, 1909
 Mylabris neglecta (Escherich, 1899)
 Mylabris nevadensis (Escalera, 1915)
 Mylabris nigricaudus (Olivier, 1811)
 Mylabris novemdecimpunctata Olivier
 Mylabris nuristanica Kaszab, 1958
 Mylabris obsoleta Novicki, 1872
 Mylabris ocellata (Pallas, 1773)
 Mylabris oleae Chevrolat, 1840
 Mylabris olivieri Billberg, 1813
 Mylabris omocrates Wellman, 1910
 Mylabris ongueriana Kaszab, 1981
 Mylabris opacula Marseul, 1879
 Mylabris orientalis Marseul, 1872
 Mylabris paliji Kotschenov, 1970
 Mylabris pallasi Gebler, 1829
 Mylabris palliata Marseul, 1872
 Mylabris pallipes (Olivier, 1811)
 Mylabris pannonica Kaszab, 1956
 Mylabris pardoi Saha, 1972
 Mylabris parumpicta (Heyden, 1883)
 Mylabris paulinoi Marseul, 1879
 Mylabris pauper (Escherich, 1899)
 Mylabris pentheri Ganglbauer, 1905
 Mylabris pertinax Péringuey, 1909
 Mylabris phalerata Pallas
 Mylabris phelopsis Marseul, 1879
 Mylabris picteti Marseul, 1872
 Mylabris pilifera Marseul, 1872
 Mylabris plagiata (Pallas, 1782)
 Mylabris platai Pardo Alcaide, 1975
 Mylabris plurivulnera Dohrn, 1873
 Mylabris pluvialis Wellman, 1910
 Mylabris posticalis (Dokhtouroff, 1889)
 Mylabris postsexmaculata Pic, 1913
 Mylabris postunifasciata Pic, 1913
 Mylabris praestans Gerstaecker, 1871
 Mylabris pruinosa Gerstaecker, 1854
 Mylabris pubescens Klug, 1835
 Mylabris pulchella Faldermann, 1833
 Mylabris pulchra Kaszab, 1973
 Mylabris pusilla A. G. Olivier, 1811
 Mylabris quadripunctata (Linnaeus, 1767)
 Mylabris quadrisignata Fischer von Waldheim, 1823
 Mylabris quatuordecimmaculata Dokhtouroff, 1889
 Mylabris quinquemaculata Okamoto, 1924
 Mylabris quinqueplagiata Kaszab, 1958
 Mylabris raja Marseul, 1872
 Mylabris rajasthanicus Saha, 1972
 Mylabris raml W. Schneider, 1991
 Mylabris recognita Walker, 1859
 Mylabris rimosa Marseul, 1870
 Mylabris rorifera Gestro, 1895
 Mylabris rufitarsis Marseul, 1879
 Mylabris rufonotata Pic, 1909
 Mylabris rutilicollis Fairmaire, 1893
 Mylabris rutilipupes Marseul, 1872
 Mylabris sairamensis Ballion, 1878
 Mylabris salaamensis Pic, 1913
 Mylabris sanghana Pic, 1909
 Mylabris sanguinosa Marseul, 1872
 Mylabris scalaris Marseul, 1872
 Mylabris schreibersi Reiche, 1866
 Mylabris schrenki Gebler, 1841
 Mylabris sculptilis Kaszab, 1958
 Mylabris sedecimguttata (Thunberg, 1791)
 Mylabris sedecimpunctata Gebler, 1825
 Mylabris sedilethorax Sumakov, 1929
 Mylabris semilutea Pic, 1910
 Mylabris seminigra Voigts, 1901
 Mylabris semivittata (Pic, 1947)
 Mylabris sennae Gestro, 1895
 Mylabris serena (Escherich, 1899)
 Mylabris severini Pic, 1909
 Mylabris sexnotata L. Redtenbacher, 1843
 Mylabris sibirica Fischer von Waldheim, 1823
 Mylabris sibutensis Pic, 1913
 Mylabris sibylae Wellman, 1910
 Mylabris sinuata Klug, 1845
 Mylabris sisymbrii Klug, 1845
 Mylabris smaragdina Gebler, 1841
 Mylabris sobrina Graells, 1851
 Mylabris solanensis Saha, 1979
 Mylabris somalica Thomas, 1900
 Mylabris speciosa (Pallas, 1781)
 Mylabris splendidula (Pallas, 1781)
 Mylabris steppensis (Dokhtouroff, 1889)
 Mylabris subbrevicornis Kaszab, 1958
 Mylabris subelongata Pic, 1910
 Mylabris submetallica Pic, 1909
 Mylabris submetalliceps Pic, 1913
 Mylabris suturalis (Pic, 1898)
 Mylabris svacopina Marseul, 1872
 Mylabris syriaca Klug, 1845
 Mylabris tarbagataiensis (Pic, 1919)
 Mylabris tauricola Marseul, 1870
 Mylabris tenebrosa Laporte de Castelnau, 1840
 Mylabris testaceilabris Pic, 1913
 Mylabris testudo Marseul, 1872
 Mylabris tettensis Gerstaecker, 1854
 Mylabris thamii Kocher, 1963
 Mylabris theryi (Abeille de Perrin, 1894)
 Mylabris thunbergi (Billberg, 1813)
 Mylabris tibialis Marseul, 1872
 Mylabris tiflensis Billberg, 1813
 Mylabris tillensis (Billberg, 1813)
 Mylabris tindila Wellman, 1910
 Mylabris tomentosa (Escherich, 1899)
 Mylabris tricincta Chevrolat, 1840
 Mylabris trifasciata (Thunberg, 1791)
 Mylabris trifascis (Pallas, 1773)
 Mylabris trifolia Marseul, 1872
 Mylabris trigonalis (Lichtenstein, 1795)
 Mylabris tripartita Gerstaecker, 1854
 Mylabris tristigma Gerstaecker, 1854
 Mylabris tristriguttata Marseul, 1879
 Mylabris trivittis (Pallas, 1782)
 Mylabris turkestanica (Dokhtouroff, 1889)
 Mylabris uhagoni Martinez y Sáez, 1873
 Mylabris undecimnotata (Heyden, 1883)
 Mylabris undecimpunctata Fischer von Waldheim, 1842
 Mylabris unicincta Linell, 1869
 Mylabris unicolor Faldermann, 1837
 Mylabris variabilis (Pallas, 1781)
 Mylabris varians Gyllenhaal, 1817
 Mylabris versuta Péringuey, 1909
 Mylabris vestita Reiche in Ferret & Galin, 1849
 Mylabris vicinalis Marseul, 1872
 Mylabris viridescens Pic, 1908
 Mylabris viridimetallica Pic, 1913
 Mylabris waziristanica (Kaszab, 1958)
 Mylabris zoltankaszabi Ruiz & García-París, 2007

References

 Synopsis of the described Coleoptera of the World
 Fauna Europaea

Meloidae
Tenebrionoidea genera